Acchampeta (or Atchampeta) is a hamlet in Racherla mandal, Prakasam District of Andhra Pradesh, India. The village forms a panchayat segment with Chinaganapalle village.

Geography

The village has an altitude of 224m.

Economy
The village relies on agriculture for its subsistence. Water for farming is supplied through underground borewells, which have seen their levels decrease substantially due to drought. The village also has a primary school for 1st through 5th grade and a small temple to Lord Shri Ram.

References

Villages in Prakasam district